Moses J. Wentworth was an American lawyer and politician from Chicago, Illinois who served as a member of the 29th Illinois General Assembly, in the Illinois House of Representatives, from the 1st district. He was elected as a member of the short-lived Illinois Opposition Party. While in the Illinois General Assembly, he introduced the successful statute which required compulsory school attendance in Illinois.

By 1896 he was associated with the Democratic Party, and was a gold Democrat delegate to the 1896 Democratic National Convention.

He was the nephew of "Long John" Wentworth, mayor of Chicago, and handled his uncle's business affairs and estate.

References 

Lawyers from Chicago
Illinois lawyers
Democratic Party members of the Illinois House of Representatives
Year of birth missing
Year of death missing